Leonardo "Léo" da Costa Bolgado (born 20 August 1998) is a Brazilian professional footballer who plays as a centre-back for Casa Pia.

Professional career
Bolgado is a youth product of the Brazilian clubs Cruzeiro and Coimbra, and had a stint on loan with the Académica U23s in Portugal in the 2019-20 season. He began his senior career with Alverca on loan from Coimbra for the 2020-21 season in the Portuguese third division. The following season he was loaned to Leixões in the Liga Portugal 2 in the 2021-22 season, where he was named to that divion's Team of the Season making 32 appearances. On 7 July 2022, he transferred to Casa Pia, they were newly promoted to the Portuguese Primeira Liga.

References

External links
 

1998 births
Living people
People from Cuiabá
Brazilian footballers
Association football defenders
F.C. Alverca players
Leixões S.C. players
Casa Pia A.C. players
Primeira Liga players
Liga Portugal 2 players
Campeonato de Portugal (league) players
Brazilian expatriate footballers
Brazilian expatriates in Portugal
Expatriate footballers in Portugal